Freedom Downtime is a 2001 documentary film sympathetic to the convicted computer hacker Kevin Mitnick, directed by Emmanuel Goldstein and produced by 2600 Films.

The documentary centers on the fate of Mitnick, who is claimed to have been misrepresented in the feature film Takedown (2000) produced by Miramax and adapted from the book by the same name by Tsutomu Shimomura and John Markoff, which is based on disputed events. The film also documents a number of computer enthusiasts who drive across the United States searching for Miramax representatives and demonstrating their discontent with certain aspects of the bootleg script of Takedown they had acquired. One of their major points of criticism was that the script ended with Mitnick being convicted to serve a long-term prison sentence, while in reality, at the time the film's production, Mitnick had not yet even had a trial but nonetheless was incarcerated for five years without bail in a high-security facility. Freedom Downtime also touches on what happened to other hackers after being sentenced. The development of the Free Kevin movement is also covered.

Several notable and iconic figures from the hacking community appear in the movie, including Phiber Optik (Mark Abene), Bernie S (Ed Cummings), Alex Kasper, and director Emmanuel Goldstein (Eric Corley). Freedom Downtime tries to communicate a different view of the hacker community from that usually shown by the mainstream media, with hackers being depicted as curious people who rarely intend to cause damage, driven by a desire to explore and conduct pranks. The film questions the rationality of placing computer hackers who went "over the line" in the same environment as serious felons.

It also contains interviews with people related to Mitnick and hacker culture in general. While Hafner's empathy for Mitnick is shown to have grown, Markoff continues to defend his critical book and articles in The New York Times newspaper about the hacker. Markoff is ridiculed as the narrator, director Goldstein (a hacker himself), points out his factual errors during the interview. Reba Vartanian, Mitnick's grandmother, also appears in a number of interview segments. Furthermore, lawyers, friends, and libertarians give their view of the story. Footage and interviews from the DEF CON and Hackers on Planet Earth conventions try to dispel some hacker myths and confirm others.

The film premiered at H2K, the 2000 H.O.P.E. convention.  After that the film saw a limited independent theatrical release and was shown at film festivals.  It was released on VHS and sold via the 2600 website.

In June 2004, a DVD was released.  The DVD includes a wealth of extra material spread over two discs, including three hours of extra footage, an interview with Kevin Mitnick in January 2003 (shortly after his supervised release ended), and various DVD eggs. It also includes subtitles in 20 languages, provided by volunteers.

References

External links
 
 
 Watch/Download Freedom Downtime from Archive.org
Watch/Download Freedom Downtime from Defcon.org

2001 films
American documentary films
2600: The Hacker Quarterly
Documentary films about the Internet
Hacker culture
Works about computer hacking
2000s English-language films
2000s American films